A list of films produced by the Marathi language film industry based in Maharashtra in the year 1960.

1960 Releases
A list of Marathi films released in 1960.

References

Lists of 1960 films by country or language
 Marathi
1960